The 1978 United States House of Representatives elections in South Carolina were held on November 7, 1978, to select six Representatives for two-year terms from the state of South Carolina.  The primary elections for the Democrats and the Republicans were held on June 13.  All five incumbents who ran were re-elected, but the open seat in the 4th congressional district was taken by the Republicans from the Democrats.  The composition of the state delegation after the elections was four Democrats and two Republicans.

1st congressional district
Incumbent Democratic Congressman Mendel Jackson Davis of the 1st congressional district, in office since 1971, defeated Benjamin Frasier in the Democratic primary and Republican C.C. Wannamaker in the general election.

Democratic primary

General election results

|-
| 
| colspan=5 |Democratic hold
|-

2nd congressional district
Incumbent Republican Congressman Floyd Spence of the 2nd congressional district, in office since 1971, defeated Democratic challenger Jack Bass.

Democratic primary

General election results

|-
| 
| colspan=5 |Republican hold
|-

3rd congressional district
Incumbent Democratic Congressman Butler Derrick of the 3rd congressional district, in office since 1975, defeated Republican challenger Anthony J. Panuccio.

General election results

|-
| 
| colspan=5 |Democratic hold
|-

4th congressional district
Incumbent Democratic Congressman James R. Mann of the 4th congressional district, in office since 1969, opted to retire.  Carroll A. Campbell Jr., a Republican state senator from Greenville, defeated Robert Watkins in the Republican primary and Democrat Max M. Heller in the general election.

Democratic primary

Republican primary

General election results

|-
| 
| colspan=5 |Republican gain from Democratic
|-

5th congressional district
Incumbent Democratic Congressman Kenneth Lamar Holland of the 5th congressional district, in office since 1975, defeated Colleen H. Yates in the Democratic primary and Independent Harold Hough in the general election.

Democratic primary

General election results

|-
| 
| colspan=5 |Democratic hold
|-

6th congressional district
Incumbent Democratic Congressman John Jenrette of the 6th congressional district, in office since 1975, defeated Jeryl Best in the Democratic primary and was unopposed in the general election.

Democratic primary

General election results

|-
| 
| colspan=5 |Democratic hold
|-

See also
1978 United States House of Representatives elections
1978 United States Senate election in South Carolina
1978 South Carolina gubernatorial election
South Carolina's congressional districts

References

United States House of Representatives
1978
South Carolina